Dry Run is a tributary of the West Branch Susquehanna River in Northumberland County, Pennsylvania, in the United States. The stream is impaired by sedimentation/siltation from agriculture and is a relatively small valley stream. Several bridges have been constructed across it. The stream is designated as a Warmwater Fishery and a Migratory Fishery.

Course

Dry Run begins on a low hill in Delaware Township. It flows north-northeast for a few tenths of a mile before reaching the bottom of the hill and gradually turning west-northwest. After more than a mile, the stream receives an unnamed tributary from the right and enters the census-designated place of Dewart. In Dewart, it flows west-northwest for a few tenths of a mile before turning west-southwest for several tenths of a mile and crossing a railroad. The stream then turns south for several tenths of a mile, exiting Dewart and crossing Pennsylvania Route 44/Pennsylvania Route 405 before turning west. A short distance further downstream, it reaches its confluence with the West Branch Susquehanna River.

Hydrology
Dry Run is designated as an impaired waterbody. The cause of impairment is sedimentation/siltation. The likely source of impairment is agriculture.

At the point where Dry Run crosses a Conrail railroad, the stream's peak annual discharge has a 10 percent chance of reaching . It has a 2 percent chance of reaching  and a 1 percent chance of reaching . The peak annual discharge has a 0.2 percent chance of reaching .

At the point where Dry Run crosses Township Route 627, the stream's peak annual discharge has a 10 percent chance of reaching . It has a 2 percent chance of reaching  and a 1 percent chance of reaching . The peak annual discharge has a 0.2 percent chance of reaching .

Geography and geology

Dry Run is a relatively small valley stream.

Watershed
The mouth of the stream is in the United States Geological Survey quadrangle of Allenwood. However, its source is in the quadrangle of Milton. The mouth of the stream is located within  of Watsontown.

A Conrail railroad crosses Dry Run at one point.

According to the Warrior Run Pathways Partnership, Dry Run could benefit from improved stream and watershed management practices, including the installation of riparian buffers, installing fencing, management of waste and nutrients, and reforestation. The designated use for the stream is aquatic life.

History
Dry Run was entered into the Geographic Names Information System on August 2, 1979. Its identifier in the Geographic Names Information System is 1173546.

A concrete channel beam bridge carrying State Route 1003 over the stream was built in 1950 and repaired in 2009.

A bridge rehabilitation of the bridge carrying Pennsylvania Route 44 over Dry Run has been proposed for a cost of $945,000. In 2015, the Northumberland County Conservation District received a $200,000 Growing Greener grant to install animal fencing and implement streambank stabilization on Dry Run.

Biology
The drainage basin of Dry Run is designated as a Warmwater Fishery and a Migratory Fishery.

As of 2015, there is a cattle operation at the headwaters of Dry Run.

See also
Spring Run (West Branch Susquehanna River), next tributary of the West Branch Susquehanna River going downriver
Delaware Run, next tributary of the West Branch Susquehanna River going upriver
List of rivers of Pennsylvania

References

Rivers of Northumberland County, Pennsylvania
Tributaries of the West Branch Susquehanna River
Rivers of Pennsylvania